Karlsson-on-the-Roof is a character who figures in a series of children's books by the Swedish author Astrid Lindgren. Translated books and cartoon adaptation of the series became popular in the Soviet Union when it was released in the 1970s. Lindgren may have borrowed the idea for the series from a similar story about Mr. O'Malley in the comic strip "Barnaby" (1942) by Crockett Johnson.

Plot
Karlsson is a very short, plump and overconfident man who lives in a small house hidden behind a chimney on the roof of "a very ordinary apartment building on a very ordinary street" in Vasastan, Stockholm. When Karlsson pushes a button on his stomach, it starts a clever little engine with a propeller on his back, allowing him to fly.

In his own opinion, Karlsson is the best at everything. He befriends Svante Svantesson, a seven-year-old boy and youngest member of the Svantesson family (who is often referred to as "Little Brother", or "Malysh" in the Russian adaptations). Svante is sometimes called Smidge in the US version of the books.

Karlsson is quite mischievous and likes to make fun and prank others. He often gets Lillebror into trouble, as Karlsson usually disappears just before Lillebror's family arrives leaving him to deal with consequences of Karlsson’s actions. 

At first, parents, siblings and friends of Lillebror don't believe that Karlsson is real and consider him being an imaginary friend but after they meet him in person they begin to like the little flying man.

Another character to encounter Karlsson is Fröken Bock (Miss Hildur Bock), a mean nanny (presumably in her late 40s or 50s), who undergoes an emotional transformation after meeting Karlsson.

Development 
Karlsson's predecessor is Mr. Lilyvale. Mr. Lilyvale was a small, flying, friendly old man and fantasy friend of Lindgren's daughter Karin. In the evening he visited her in her room. Lindgren's daughter explained that Mr. Lilyvale could not be seen by anyone else because he flew away or hid as soon as someone entered the room. Astrid Lindgren wrote the book In the Land of Twilight about Mr. Lilyvale. At that time, Mr. Lilyvale was friendlier, less selfish, bossy or self centered. He also had no propeller. According to Astrid Lindgren, Mr. Lilyvale later turned into Karlsson.

Series
There are three Karlsson-on-the-Roof books:
1955: Karlsson-on-the-Roof
1962: Karlsson Flies Again
1968: Karlsson-on-the-Roof is Sneaking Around Again

Adaptations

There have been several film versions of the series. 

The two Soviet animated films, directed by Boris Stepantsev at Soyuzmultfilm studio in 1968 (Kid and Karlsson, 19 min) and 1970 (Karlsson Returns, 20 min), are among the most celebrated and loved cartoons in Russia and other ex-Soviet countries. Karlsson was voiced by Vasily Livanov and Malysh by Klara Rumyanova in both animated films, while Fröken Bock was voiced by Faina Ranevskaya in the second film. In 1971, the character was also adapted for the Soviet stage at the Moscow Satire Theatre, where Karlsson was portrayed by Spartak Mishulin.

A live-action version, Världens bästa Karlsson, was released in Sweden in 1974, as was an animated film in 2002.

References

Astrid Lindgren characters
Fictional Swedish people
Literary characters introduced in 1955
1955 novels
1955 children's books
Swedish children's novels
Series of children's books
Stockholm in fiction
Male characters in literature
Child characters in literature